Depot Field Hospital was one of seven hospitals operated at City Point, Virginia during the Siege of Petersburg during the American Civil War.

The largest was the Depot Field Hospital which covered nearly 200 acres (800,000 m2) and could hold up to 10,000 patients. Twelve hundred tents, supplemented by ninety log barracks in the winter, comprised the compound, which included laundries, dispensaries, regular and special diet kitchens, dining halls, offices and other structures. Army surgeons administered the hospital aided by civilian agencies such as the United States Sanitary Commission and the U.S. Christian Commission. Male nurses, drawn from the ranks, made sure each patient had his own bed and wash basin; and regularly received fresh pillows and linens. The excellence of the facilities and the efficiency and dedication of the staff not only made the Depot Field Hospital the largest facility of its kind in America but also the finest.

See also
List of former United States Army medical units

Virginia in the American Civil War
American Civil War hospitals
Prince George County in the American Civil War
Closed medical facilities of the United States Army
Closed installations of the United States Army